Garnett McMillan (May 8, 1842 – January 14, 1875) was a 19th-century politician from the U.S. state of Georgia.

Garnett was the son of Colonel Robert McMillan, an Irish immigrant from Antrim who raised a company of infantry at Clarkesville, Georgia that would become Co. K of the 24th Georgia Regiment of Volunteers. Young Garnett served as a Lt. in Company K, while his father became the commanding officer of the regiment. He would serve in this position until June 1863 when he was promoted and transferred to a sharpshooters battalion.
During the American Civil War McMillan had served in the Georgia 3rd Battalion, Sharpshooters, commanding Company B. He was elected in 1874 as a Democrat to represent Georgia's 9th congressional district in the 44th United States Congress.

McMillan died on January 14, 1875, before the congress commenced. He is buried in the Old Clarkesville Cemetery, Habersham County Georgia.

See also
List of members-elect of the United States House of Representatives who never took their seats

References

External links
https://web.archive.org/web/20100531062826/http://www.colquitt.k12.ga.us/gspurloc/Cobbslegion/gasca/units/3rd_bttn_sharpshooters.htm

1875 deaths
Elected officials who died without taking their seats
Georgia (U.S. state) Democrats
People of Georgia (U.S. state) in the American Civil War
1842 births